Pseudognaphalium affine is a species of flowering plant belonging to the genus Pseudognaphalium. The species is widely distributed in East Asia, Southeast Asia, South Asia, Transcaucasus and Anatolia.

The plant is biennial, with stems 15–40 cm long, the surface of the plant is covered with fine woolly hair and the leaves are small and rounded. The flowers appear as small florets with petal around 2 mm long.

In Chinese this plant is known as shǔqúcǎo (lit. "mouse yeast grass") and used to make rice-flour pastry for the Qingming Festival; it is sometimes used to flavor the caozai guo consumed on Taiwan on Tomb Sweeping Day in the spring. "mother and child grass"). G. affine is one of the herbs consumed during the Seven-Herbs Festival in the spring. In Vietnam, it is named rau khúc.

Uses
This plant has been used traditionally in Traditional Chinese medicine and also features in the cuisine of East Asian Countries namely in sweet rice confections. They include the Japanese Kusa mochi and the Taiwanese chhú-khak-ké (鼠麹粿/鼠麴草, 草仔粿).

The plant is also ground up and used to give noodles and green onion pancakes (蔥油餅) a distinctive green colour and a unique flavour.

This is an ingredient for a kind of xôi- xôi khúc in Vietnam and people usually use it for treatment of common cough.

References

affine
Flora of Nepal